Nurse Next Door Home Care Services is a Canadian-based franchise system that offers private home care to seniors. Services range from companionship to round-the-clock nursing care. The system currently has over 200 franchise locations across Canada, US, and Australia.

In 2018 Nurse Next Door awarded their first international deal, with the company's Australian Master Franchise going to Melbourne locals Amber Biesse and Matt Fitton.

History
Nurse Next Door Home Care Services was launched in Vancouver, British Columbia in September 2001 by co-founders Ken Sim and John DeHart. The two decided to start the company after trying to find quality care for Ken's pregnant wife Teena (who was placed on emergency bed rest with their first child).  The company began franchising in April 2007 and has since added over 200 senior home care franchise locations across Canada, US, and Australia.

The company has been recognized with numerous awards including the 2006 Ernst & Young Entrepreneur of the Year Award as well as being named as one of the top 10 small and medium employers in Canada in 2012. They are also 4 time top ten winners of BC Business Best Companies to Work For award, coming in 1st place in 2009 and 3rd place in 2012.
Nurse Next Door Home Care Services has also been widely featured in media across Canada and the United States including The National Post, The Globe and Mail, CBC, The Vancouver Sun and Fortune Small Business Magazine.

Australia 
Nurse Next Door Home Care Services awarded the company's Australian Master Franchise in 2018 to Melbourne Entrepreneurs, Amber Biesse and Matt Fitton. Amber and Matt have been referred to as serial entrepreneurs, having run multiple successful businesses during their lifetime. Due to the rapid growth of the NDIS and Australian's desire to age at home, Nurse Next Door Australia has experienced unprecedented expansion. After launching their first franchise in May 2020, the Australian business has 40 locations operating nationally and a corporate location based in Melbourne as the end of 2022.

References

Health care companies of Canada
2001 establishments in British Columbia